Cychrus businskyanus is a species of ground beetle in the subfamily of Carabinae. It was described by Imura in 2000.

References

businskyanus
Beetles described in 2000